The Philippines participated at the 25th Southeast Asian Games held in Vientiane, Laos from 9 to 18 December 2009.

Preparations 

So far, the Philippine team has been training locally. It has made plans for national athletes for the 3 remaining months before the  2009 Southeast Asian Games which is to be held in Vientiane, Laos. According to news, the Philippine national team lack funding form the government yet still hopes to achieve a good training program for its athletes. Harry Angping, the PSC Chairman, wants to send the country's athletes to China, world sports' superpower, to have an intensive training which can greatly boost the skills of the athletes especially in the sports of volleyball, diving, shooting, cycling and weightlifting.

The country is looking after its gold and silver medallists at the latest SEAG which was held last 2007 although some of them have already retired.

The country is said to have a powerhouse team in the sport of billiards and snooker which is composed of former and current world champions such as Efren Bata Reyes, Ronato Alcano, Alex Pagulayan and Rubilen Amit. The country is expecting to get a perfect 10 gold medal in the said sport because of its great athletes. Another powerhouse team in Philippine national team is swimming. It has been said that the swimming team is almost composed of its Olympian tankers like Miguel Molina, Ryan Arabejo, James Walsh, Daniel Coakley, Christel Simms and Erica Totten.

Expectations 

The country hopes to rebound from its worst finish in SEAG last 2 years. The country placed sixth over-all with 42 golds, 91 silvers and 96 bronzes. The country is hoping to regain the over-all championship from Thailand even though it will really have a tough way. The country is still unsure of how many gold medals can the athletes garner since the number of athletes joining the international competition is still undetermined although some of the athletes such as Nathaniel Padilla, Shiela Mae Perez, Hidilyn Diaz, Rexel Ryan Fabriga, Willy Wang and Miguel Molina.

The country will send its one of the lowest number of delegates which is 153 and officials which is 47 although this is not a final count according to POC. Although the number of athletes and officials to be sent in this SEAG edition is just 1/3 of the number of delegates sent in the 2007 SEAG, it is known that the Philippine team is still a powerhouse team because all of the included athletes in the list are gold and silver medalists in the 2007 SEAG and 2008 Beijing Olympians. The PSC promised to boost the earnings of the athletes who will get gold medals for the country at the upcoming SEAG.
|}

Medalists

Gold

Silver

Bronze

Medal summary

By sports

Issues 

Philippine NSA's still have leadership quarrels which greatly affect the training of its athletes even though there are only barely three months left before the national competition happens.

Lack of government funding is also another factor why Philippine athletes have not yet been sent to other countries such as China to have an intensive training program.

The country is focusing more on subjective sports such as boxing, judo, taekwondo, diving and karatedo than objective sports such as athletics, shooting, swimming, weightlifting, lawn tennis, table tennis and badminton which are really rich in medals. The country's athletes in the said subjective sports can easily be cheated since those sports are scored by judges.

References 

Nations at the 2009 Southeast Asian Games
2009
2009 in Philippine sport